Congregation of the Presentation may refer to several Roman Catholic female religious congregations

Daughters of the Presentation
The Daughters of the Presentation were founded in 1627 by Nicolas Sanguin (b. 1580; d. 1653), Bishop of Senlis. He turned his attention to the foundation of a teaching order to combat the prevailing ignorance and the resulting vice in the diocese. Two young women from Paris, Catherine Dreux and Marie de la Croix, began the work of teaching in 1626 and the following year were formed into a religious community, which shortly afterwards was enclosed under the Rule of St. Augustine.

The opposition of the municipal authorities gave way before the Bull of erection granted by Pope Urban VIII (4 Jan., 1628) and letters patent of Louis XIII granted in 1630, the year in which the first solemn profession was held. In 1632 papal permission was obtained for two of Bishop Sanguin's sisters and a companion to leave for a time their monastery of Moncel of the Order of St. Clare, to form the new community in the religious life. Seven years later they were received as members into the new order, over which they presided for more than thirty years. The congregation did not survive the Revolution, although under Bonaparte one of the former members organized at Senlis a school which was later taken over by the municipality. The habit was black serge over a robe of white serge, with a white guimpe, a black bandeau, and veil. The original constitutions seem to have been altered by Mgr Sanguin's nephew and successor in the See of Senlis, owing to the frequent reference made in them to the devotion of the Slavery of Our Lady, which was suppressed by the Church.

Sisters of the Presentation of the Blessed Virgin
The Sisters of the Presentation of the Blessed Virgin were founded in 1684 by Marie Poussepin at Sainville in the Diocese of Chartres, for teaching and the care of the sick. At the time of the religious disturbances in France, over seventeen hundred sisters were engaged in France, Spain, South America, and Asiatic Turkey, where they have charge of a number of schools and protectories for girls. At Agua de Dios in Colombia they cared for a colony of lepers. In 1813 the mother-house was established at Saint-Symphorien near Tours.

In 1897, the congregation was affiliated with the Order of Preachers.

Sisters of the Presentation of Mary

Sisters of the Presentation of Our Lady
The Sisters of the Presentation of Our Lady were founded at Ghent in 1805 by Miss Weewauters, in religion Mother Mary Augustine, and Canon de Decker (d. 1874) for the education of girls. The mother-house is at Saint-Nicolas.

References

 The entry cites:
Heimbucher, Orden und Kongregationen (Paderborn, 1907);
Helyot, Dict. des Ordres rel. (Paris, 1859);
Vie de M. Rivier (Avignon, 1842)

Catholic female orders and societies